The Mercedes-Benz AMG C-Class W203 DTM is a DTM touring car constructed by the German car manufacturer Mercedes-Benz. It was the successor to the Mercedes-Benz CLK DTM which was permanently retired after the 2003 season, and based on the Mercedes-Benz C-Class W203 first generation car. Mercedes-Benz AMG C-Class W203 DTM made its first appearance on 3 February 2004 at the Circuit de Catalunya.

Technical details
Like all racing cars in the DTM, the C-Class W203 DTM only looks like the eponymous series cars, constructed is the prototype of a CFK - monocoque chassis with an integrated 15.4-imperial gallons fuel tank. Since refuelling at this time was still allowed in the race, a 26.4-imperial gallons tank was not built. The rear-wheel drive C-Class DTM has a sequential 6-speed sports transmission, a 3-plate carbon fiber clutch supplied by Sandtler (2004-2006) and an adjustable multi-disc limited-slip differential.

Gallery

References

External links
Mercedes-Benz Motorsport website

DTM (W203)
Deutsche Tourenwagen Masters cars